This article provides links to election results in the Malaysian Federal Territory of Labuan since 2004, and to the names of Labuan representatives in the Dewan Rakyat since 1964. Before it became a Federal Territory in 1984, Labuan was part of the Hilir Padas constituency of Sabah (1974–1984), the Labuan-Beaufort constituency of Sabah (1967–1974), and the Labuan constituency of Sabah (prior to 1967).

Federal level

Federal election results
 Results of the 2013 Malaysian general election by parliamentary constituency#Federal Territory of Labuan
 Results of the 2008 Malaysian general election by parliamentary constituency#Federal Territory of Labuan
 Results of the 2004 Malaysian general election by parliamentary constituency#Federal Territory of Labuan

Federal constituencies
 List of Malaysian electoral districts#Federal Territory of Labuan
 List of former Malaysian federal electoral districts#Federal Territories
 List of former Malaysian federal electoral districts#Sabah

Elected members of the Dewan Rakyat
 Members of the Dewan Rakyat, 13th Malaysian Parliament#Federal Territory of Labuan
 Members of the Dewan Rakyat, 12th Malaysian Parliament#Federal Territory of Labuan
 Members of the Dewan Rakyat, 11th Malaysian Parliament#Federal Territory of Labuan
 Members of the Dewan Rakyat, 10th Malaysian Parliament#Federal Territory of Labuan
 Members of the Dewan Rakyat, 9th Malaysian Parliament#Federal Territory of Labuan
 Members of the Dewan Rakyat, 8th Malaysian Parliament#Federal Territory of Labuan
 Members of the Dewan Rakyat, 7th Malaysian Parliament#Federal Territory of Labuan
 Members of the Dewan Rakyat, 6th Malaysian Parliament#Sabah
 Members of the Dewan Rakyat, 5th Malaysian Parliament#Sabah
 Members of the Dewan Rakyat, 4th Malaysian Parliament#Sabah
 Members of the Dewan Rakyat, 3rd Malaysian Parliament#Sabah

State level

State constituencies
 List of former Malaysian state electoral districts#Sabah

Elected members of the Sabah State Legislative Assembly
 List of Malaysian State Assembly Representatives (1978–82)#Sabah
 List of Malaysian State Assembly Representatives (1974–78)#Sabah
 List of Malaysian State Assembly Representatives (1969–74)#Sabah
 List of Malaysian State Assembly Representatives (1964–69)#Sabah

Elections in Malaysia